The Clayton Hotel Burlington Road is a hotel in Dublin, Ireland. It is the largest hotel in central Dublin, and the second largest in County Dublin after the Citywest Hotel.

History
The hotel was developed on the site of what was formerly the grounds of Wesley College Dublin and included the Victorian houses - Burlington House, Tullamaine Villa and Embury House (formerly Burleigh House). It also encompassed the site of Mespil House, a large notable Georgian house which was demolished in the 1950s.

Completed in 1972 by P.V. Doyle initially as part of Doyle Hotels and named the Burlington Hotel and nicknamed "the Burlo" by Dubliners, the hotel was purchased by property developer Bernard McNamara in 2007 for €288 million.

Following the post-2008 Irish economic downturn, Bank of Scotland (Ireland) took possession of the hotel from McNamara. It was sold in 2012 to The Blackstone Group for €67 million, in what was Ireland's biggest property transaction since the start of the downturn. The DoubleTree chain assumed management in 2013, and the hotel was rebranded as DoubleTree by Hilton Dublin – Burlington Road. In 2016, Blackstone sold the hotel to the German investment bank DekaBank, and a 25-year lease to operate the hotel was granted to the Dalata Hotel Group, which rebranded it within their Clayton Hotels brand as Clayton Hotel Burlington Road in November 2016.

The hotel's former nightclub, Club Anabel, gained notoriety in 2000 when the death of Brian Murphy took place during a fight outside the premises.

References

Hotels in Dublin (city)
Hotels established in 1972
Hotel buildings completed in 1972
1972 establishments in Ireland